KOER-LP (101.5 FM) is a terrestrial American low power radio station, licensed to Cypress, Harris County, Texas, United States, and is owned by Rhema Gospel Radio of Cypress, Texas.

References

External links

OER-LP
Radio stations established in 2016
OER-LP